Guy Frederick Moore (30 June 1928 – 13 September 1973) was an Australian rules footballer who played with Collingwood in the Victorian Football League (VFL).

Family
The son of Charles Frederick Moore (1900–1985), and Lexie Moore (1902–1994), née Mounsey, Guy Frederick Moore was born at Northcote, Victoria 30 June 1928.

He married Lorna Joyce Kavanagh (1924–2016) in 1948.

Football

Collingwood (VFL)
He played in his first match, at the age of 16, at full-forward (he kicked two goals) for the Collingwood First XVIII, against Richmond, at Victoria Park, on 16 June 1945.<ref>[http://nla.gov.au/nla.news-article178150608 Colts get Chance in Today's Game, The Sporting Globe, Wednesday, 4 August 1948), p.8.]</ref>

Preston (VFA)
He was granted a clearance from Collingwood to Preston on 16 April 1952.

Death
He died on 13 September 1973.

 Notes 
		

References
 
		
 External links 

Guy Moore's playing statistics from The VFA ProjectProfile on Collingwood Forever''

1928 births
1973 deaths
Australian rules footballers from Melbourne
Collingwood Football Club players
Preston Football Club (VFA) players
People from Northcote, Victoria